The Abilene Christian Wildcats football program is the intercollegiate American football team for the Abilene Christian University located in the U.S. state of Texas. The team was a member of the Southland Conference through the 2020–21 season, but joined the Western Athletic Conference in July 2021, coinciding with that league's reinstatement of football as an official conference sport. After the 2022 season, the WAC fully merged its football league with that of the ASUN Conference, creating the ASUN–WAC Football Conference, and ACU accordingly moved its football team to the new league. The school's first football team was fielded in 1919. The team plays its home games at the on-campus Anthony Field at Wildcat Stadium.

History

Football classifications
 1951–1972:  College Division (small school)

 1973–1982: NAIA Division I
 1982–2012: NCAA Division II
 2013–present: NCAA Division I Football Championship Subdivision
 Abilene Christian did not field a team in 1943–1945.

Conference affiliations
 1919–1924: Independent
 1925–1932: Texas Intercollegiate Athletic Association
 1931–1932: Independent
 1933–1942, 1946–1953: Texas Conference
 No team 1943–1945 due to World War II
 1954: Independent
 1955–1956: Gulf Coast Conference
 1957–1963: Independent
 1964–1972: Southland Conference
 1973–2012: Lone Star Conference
 2013: NCAA Division I FCS independent
 2014–2020: Southland Conference
 2021–2022: Western Athletic Conference
 2023–present: ASUN–WAC Football Conference

Head coaching history

Notable former players
Notable alumni include:

 Charcandrick West
 Mitchell Gale
 Grant Feasel
 James Hill
 Ove Johansson
 Johnny Knox
 Clint Longley
 Danieal Manning
 Reggie McGowan
 Wilbert Montgomery
 Cle Montgomery
 Johnny Perkins
 Bernard Scott
 Major Culbert
 Taylor Gabriel
 Clyde Gates
 Bob Oliver
 Daryl Richardson
 John Layfield
 Bernie Erickson
 Wayne Walton

Championships

National championships

Conference championships

† Co-champions

Division championships

† Co-champions

Bowl games

Playoff appearances

NCAA Division II
The Wildcats have appeared in the Division II playoffs six times with an overall record of 3–6.

NAIA
The Wildcats have appeared in the NAIA playoffs two times with an overall record of 4–0. They were National Champions in 1973 and 1977.

Future non-conference opponents 
Announced schedules as of December 18, 2022.

See also
 List of NCAA Division I FCS football stadiums

References

External links
 

 
American football teams established in 1919
1919 establishments in Texas